The Gaucho Priest (Spanish: El cura gaucho) is a 1941 Argentine historical film directed by Lucas Demare. The film's art direction was by Ralph Pappier.

Cast
 Aída Alberti  
 Graciliano Batista   
 José Casamayor 
 Homero Cárpena   
 José De Angelis  
 Salvador Lotito  
 Mecha López  
 Enrique Muiño   
 René Múgica  
 Horacio Priani 
 Marino Seré    
 Héctor Torres    
 Eloy Álvarez

References

Bibliography 
 Rist, Peter H. Historical Dictionary of South American Cinema. Rowman & Littlefield, 2014.

External links
 

1941 films
1940s Spanish-language films
Argentine black-and-white films
Argentine historical drama films
1940s historical drama films
Films directed by Lucas Demare
1941 drama films
1940s Argentine films